Velká Buková is a municipality and village in Rakovník District in the Central Bohemian Region of the Czech Republic. It has about 300 inhabitants.

Administrative parts
Villages of Kalubice and Malá Buková are administrative parts of Velká Buková.

References

Villages in Rakovník District